Tent City, also called Freedom Village, was an encampment outside of Memphis in Fayette County, Tennessee for African Americans who were evicted from their homes and blacklisted from buying amenities as retaliation for registering to vote during the Civil Rights Movement. It began in 1960 and lasted about two years.

Origins

In 1960, 1,400 Black Americans registered to vote in deeply segregated Fayette County. In retaliation, white landowners evicted 257 Black sharecroppers from their homes. Shepard Towles, a local Black landowner, let the displaced farmers camp on his land. Towles stated, "These people had nowhere to go. I decided to let them come in free, let them use the water from my deep well—as long as it lasts." This became known as Tent City. Previously, John McFerren and Harpman Jameson founded the Fayette County Civic and Welfare League to 'promote civil and political and economic' community progress. McFerren, Jameson, and J.F. Estes, a Memphis lawyer, travelled to Washington, D.C. to lobby the Justice Department to intervene on behalf of the sharecroppers. The Civil Rights Act of 1957 prohibits "against intimidating, coercing or otherwise interfering with the rights of persons to vote for the President and members of Congress." The white community then retaliated further by refusing to sell groceries and other amenities to Black registered voters.

National attention

McFerren appealed to national newspapers to draw attention to the plight of residents in Tent City. Gulf Oil, Texeco, and Esso refused to deliver gasoline to McFerren's store. The NAACP called for a national boycott of these chains. Attorney General Robert Kennedy ordered the Justice Department to investigate civil rights violations in Fayette County. The AFL-CIO published a pamphlet, Tent City... "Home of the Brave" calling for donations. In 1961, trucks arrived with 150 tons of donated food and clothes. National attention drew white civil rights advocates from Cornell University, the University of Wisconsin, and the Religious Society of Friends (Quakers). The national attention intensified voter registration drives and this eventually led to black majority voter registration, though elections were still fixed in favor of whites.

Dissolution
The largest impromptu settlement on Towles' farm lasted approximately two years. Residents moved with other black families or relocated to other parts of Tennessee.

References

Further reading

External links

 - Section 4 of the "October 1960: The Untold Story of Jackson's Civil Rights Movement" series by the newspaper Jackson Sun

African-American history of Tennessee
Fayette County, Tennessee
Shanty towns in the United States
Civil rights movement
Housing in Tennessee